Seimatosporium cornicola is an ascomycete fungus belonging to the family Amphisphaeriaceae. It is confirmed to be saprobic onto bloody dogwood, a European species. Growth attempts showed it had a slow cycle, taking a week to grow to a diameter of 2.5 cm at 18 °C. Its color and other properties are reportedly: "white to pale brown from above, greyish white from below, with sparse mycelium, flat, margin uneven". It was discovered in Italy in the year 2016 by a group of Chinese researchers.

References

External links 
 

Xylariales